Rushock is a village and civil parish in the Wyre Forest District of Worcestershire, England. At the 2001 census it had a population of 138. The grave of John Bonham, the drummer of the English rock band Led Zeppelin, can be found at the parish church.

An episode of the BBC Radio 4 Countryside Magazine Open Country featured 400 years of Rushock agricultural history.

References

1. https://www.bbc.co.uk/programmes/b00k2m7f

External links

Villages in Worcestershire